The Republic XF-12 Rainbow was an American four-engine, all-metal prototype reconnaissance aircraft designed by the Republic Aviation Company in the late 1940s. Like most large aircraft of the era, it used radial engines, specifically the Pratt & Whitney R-4360 Wasp Major. The aircraft was designed to maximize aerodynamic efficiency. Although innovative, the jet engine and the end of World War 2 made it obsolete, and it did not enter production. A proposed airliner variant, the RC-2, was deemed uneconomical and cancelled before being built.

Development
Its primary objective was high-speed overflights of the Japanese homeland and key enemy installations. During World War II, due to the range requirements of operating in the Pacific, existing fighters and bombers were being used but were poorly suited. The need existed for dedicated photo-reconnaissance aircraft with speed, range, and altitude capabilities beyond what was available.

In August 1943, U.S. President Franklin D. Roosevelt's son, Colonel Elliot Roosevelt, commander of a Lockheed F-5 (a modified P-38 Lightning) "recon" unit, recommended the acquisition of a dedicated high-performance photo reconnaissance aircraft to provide pre- and post-strike target analysis intelligence as well as photo interpretation to better allow commanders to make decisions for bombing raids. Republic Aviation submitted the XF-12 and it was competing against the Hughes XF-11. Both were powered by the new P&W R-4360. The XF-12 could photograph in both daylight and night and under conditions of reduced visibility at high altitudes over long ranges and with great speed. This "flying photo lab" was capable of mapping broad stretches of the globe.

Only two prototypes were built each of the XF-11 and the XF-12 were ordered into service by the U.S. Army Air Forces, as the requirement evaporated after World War II ended, while the cheaper off-the-shelf Boeing B-29 Superfortress and Boeing B-50 Superfortress could temporarily fill the role until the jet-powered Boeing RB-47 Stratojet entered service. The XF-12 was the fastest aircraft of its day to use four reciprocating engines, and the only one to exceed  in level flight

Design

Minimizing drag was a primary consideration throughout the design of the XF-12. Many features came from Republic's experience with fighter aircraft. Unusually, no compromises to the aerodynamics were made in the shape of its fuselage. Aviation Week was quoted as saying "the sharp nose and cylindrical cigar shape of the XF-12 fulfills a designer's dream of a no compromise design with aerodynamic considerations."

For its reconnaissance role, the XF-12 had three photographic compartments aft of the wing. One vertical, one split vertical, and one trimetrogon each using a  Fairchild K-17 camera. For night reconnaissance, the XF-12 had a belly hold which accommodated 18 high-intensity photo-flash bombs to be ejected over the target. All bays were equipped with electrically operated, inward retracting doors designed for minimum drag and camera lenses were electrically heated to prevent frost build-up. The XF-12 also carried complete darkroom facilities to permit developing and printing the film while still airborne augmented by adjustable storage racks to handle any size of film container and additional photo equipment. This allowed immediate access to the intelligence after landing without the usual processing delay.

Its wing had a straight taper with a high aspect ratio for maximum efficiency and squared tips. The engines used a sliding cowl to facilitate engine cooling instead of cowling flaps, which caused too much drag. There was also a two-stage impeller fan directly behind the propeller hub. These refinements allowed the engines to be tightly cowled for aerodynamic efficiency, while still keeping the engines adequately cooled. When the sliding cowl ring was closed during flight, the cooling air was ducted through the nacelle to the rear exhaust orifice increasing thrust, rather than adding drag as is usually the case.

Air for engine intakes, oil coolers and intercoolers was drawn through the leading edge of each wing between the inboard and outboard engines. This reduced drag compared to using individual intakes for each component. In addition, because the air was taken from a high-pressure area at the front of the wing, this provided a ram air boost for increased power at high speeds, and more effective cooling of the oil and intercoolers. The intakes made up 25% of the total wingspan and were extensively wind tunnel tested. After being used, the air was ducted toward the rear of the nacelle, to provide thrust. The entire engine nacelle was nearly as long as a Republic P-47 Thunderbolt. Each engine featured twin General Electric turbochargers at the rear of the nacelle and for brief bursts of additional power, water-methanol injection.

The XF-12 was originally intended to use contra-rotating propellers similar to those used on the XF-11, However, due to delivery delays and reliability issues, they were never installed. They would have been twinned three-bladed propellers (rotating in opposite directions). As it was, the aircraft used standard four-bladed Curtiss Electric propellers.

The only visible external difference between the first and second prototypes was the addition of cooling gills on the upper engine cowlings. The second prototype was fitted with the full reconnaissance equipment suite.

Operational history
The first prototype was damaged on 10 July 1947 while undergoing maximum landing weight tests when the right main gear was severed at the engine nacelle. After bouncing hard and staggering back into the air the test pilot climbed to a safe altitude where excess fuel was burnt off, to lighten the aircraft and reduce the risk of fire. The pilot landed on the left main gear and the nose wheel and despite losing as much speed as possible before the other wing dropped, the aircraft suffered significant damage. The wing spar was cracked, and engines and props needed to be replaced but it was repaired by Republic, and returned to service. When the U.S. Army Air Forces became the U.S. Air Force the XF-12 was later re-designated XR-12.

Operation Birds Eye was conceived to demonstrate the XF-12's capabilities. On 1 September 1948, the second prototype departed the U.S. Air Force Flight Test Center at Muroc, California, and climbed west to its  cruising altitude over the Pacific before heading east. It then photographed its entire flight path across the United States on 390 individual  photos each covering , which were jointed to form a continuous  print. 

A photo was taken approximately every 66 seconds. The flight was featured in the 29 November 1948 issue of Life magazine and the filmstrip exhibited at the 1948 U.S. Air Force Association Convention in New York. The XF-12 program had already been canceled when this flight was made. 

On 7 November 1948, the second prototype crashed while returning to Eglin Air Force Base from a photographic suitability test flight after the number 2 (port inner) engine exploded, causing violent buffeting. Five of the seven crew escaped safely while two crew members were killed.
The first prototype continued flight testing after being returned to service in 1948 but with no orders forthcoming and with the second prototype lost, flight testing was wound down and the remaining prototype was retired in June 1952, having flown just 117 hours from 1949–1952. It was later expended as a target at the Aberdeen Proving Ground, Maryland.

RC-2
Republic intended to build an airliner version as the RC-2. Pratt & Whitney R-4360-59s with only one General Electric turbosupercharger each would have replaced the R-4360-31s to provide more power at lower altitudes and fuel capacity would have been increased. The seven crew and 46 passengers would have enjoyed a lavishly appointed cabin that was pressurized to sea level with air conditioning, and served hot meals from an electric galley, and drinks from an inflight lounge.

Without military orders subsidizing development and tooling costs, the RC-2's purchase price would have been high, and American Airlines and Pan-Am cancelled their tentative orders. The RC-2 also would have had higher operating costs per passenger than more capacious airliners with similar fuel consumption such as the Lockheed Constellation and the Douglas DC-6. Additionally, the end of the war created a glut of surplus military transports such as the Douglas C-54 Skymaster which could be readily converted for airline service for a fraction of the cost of new aircraft. Republic cancelled its plans, and none were built.

Specifications (XF-12)

See also

References

Citations

Bibliography

F-012
Republic F-12
Four-engined tractor aircraft
Cancelled military aircraft projects of the United States
Low-wing aircraft
Aircraft first flown in 1946
Four-engined piston aircraft
Mid-wing aircraft